Călinești is a commune in Maramureș County, Maramureș, Romania. It is composed of three villages: Călinești, Cornești (Somosfalva) and Văleni (Mikolapatak).

At the 2002 census, 99.8% of inhabitants were Romanians. 53.9% were Romanian Orthodox, 34.7% Greek-Catholic, 5.9% belonged to "another religion" and 4.5% were Pentecostal.

References

Communes in Maramureș County
Localities in Romanian Maramureș